Gomi (written: 五味) is a Japanese surname. Notable people with the surname include:

, Japanese novelist
, "The Fireball Kid", Japanese mixed martial arts fighter
, Japanese children's book illustrator and writer
, Japanese speed-skater

Japanese-language surnames